Halloran is an unincorporated community in Butler County, in the U.S. state of Missouri.

History
A post office called Halloran was established in 1890, and remained in operation until 1911. The community derives its name from James A. Halloran, a pioneer citizen.

References

Unincorporated communities in Butler County, Missouri
Unincorporated communities in Missouri